The Keystone Ice Miners were a Junior A Tier II ice hockey team based at The Ice Mine arena in Connellsville, Pennsylvania.  The team moved to Connellsville in May 2014; prior to the move, the team was known as the Port Huron Fighting Falcons.

History 
The team began play during the 2010-11 season as the Port Huron Fighting Falcons are a Junior A Tier II ice hockey team based out of Port Huron, Michigan.  A member of the North American Hockey League's North Division, the team plays their home games in the McMorran Arena. On July 10, 2010 the team announced its name as the Fighting Falcons. Despite losing their first 15 games, they won 4-1 against the Springfield Jr. Blues on November 7 landing the team's first victory in history.

In 2014, the team announced it would be moving to Connellsville, Pennsylvania, a city south of Pittsburgh.  The team will play at the Ice Mine and change their team name to the Ice Miners.  Hat Trick Hockey, the parent ownership of the Ice Miners, announced in mid-December 2014 that they were terminating its membership with the NAHL effective immediately.  The league has indicated it plans to keep the team operational through the remainder of the 2014-15 season, including playoffs, if the Ice Miners should qualify.

Season records

Uniforms and logos 
The team's colors are light blue, black and yellow. 

Home jerseys will feature the main Fighting Falcons logo with an alternate Falcon Head logo appearing on the road jerseys. 

Shoulder patches on both home and away uniforms will feature a circular logo with the Blue Water Bridge, that spans the St. Clair River separating Port Huron, Michigan and Sarnia, Ontario, Canada.

Original logo controversy 

Released on July 10, 2010, the Fighting Falcons first logo bore a strong resemblance to a logo created by Mike Ivall of Ivall Design.

On July 15, 2010, the Fighting Falcons announced the team will create new logo to avoid any problems relating to any similarities with Ivall's concept art after he had contacted the team and noted similarities.

References

External links
 Official Website

North American Hockey League teams
North American Hockey League
Amateur ice hockey teams in Pennsylvania
Fayette County, Pennsylvania
2014 establishments in Pennsylvania
2015 disestablishments in Pennsylvania
Ice hockey clubs established in 2014
Ice hockey clubs disestablished in 2015